Saint-Ouen is a commune in the Somme department in Hauts-de-France in northern France.

Geography
The old Roman road, the Chaussée Brunehaut passes through the middle of the commune.

Population

Personalities
Alfred Manessier, (1911–1993). Artist, was born and buried at Saint-Ouen,

See also
Communes of the Somme department

References

Communes of Somme (department)